The 2004 Champ Car World Series season was the 26th overall season in the CART/Champ Car genealogy, and the first under the ownership of Open-Wheel Racing Series (OWRS) as the Champ Car World Series. It began on April 18, 2004, and ended on November 7 after 14 races. For sponsorship purposes, it was branded as Bridgestone Presents the Champ Car World Series Powered by Ford. The Drivers' Champion was Sébastien Bourdais.  The Rookie of the Year was A. J. Allmendinger.

The open-wheel racing organization Championship Auto Racing Teams, Inc. had operated until 2003. After that year's season, CART declared bankruptcy and was liquidated in an Indianapolis courtroom in January 2004. Three team owners who had participated in the CART series, Gerald Forsythe, Kevin Kalkhoven, and Paul Gentilozzi, purchased CART's liquidated assets and resurrected it as Open-Wheel Racing Series for the 2004 season.

Champ Car races were broadcast on Spike TV. Also, high-definition live broadcasts were on HDNet.

Drivers and teams 
The Ford-Cosworth XFE, a 2.65 liter turbo V8 engine remained the exclusive power plant for the reorganized Champ Car series.  Bridgestone remained the exclusive tire supplier as well.  They also continued the marketing agreement that branded the series Bridgestone Presents the Champ Car World Series Powered by Ford.  The following teams and drivers competed in the 2004 Champ Car season.

From CART to Champ Car
The assets of the bankrupt Championship Auto Racing Teams, Inc. (CART) organization were awarded to Open-Wheel Racing Series, LLC in the Indianapolis courtroom of Judge Frank Otte on January 28, 2004.  A bid from Indy Racing League owner Tony George was rejected because the former venders of CART would not have been paid, thus ensuring the split in American open-wheel racing would continue.  Despite this victory, the OWRS partners, CART team owners Kevin Kalkhoven, Gerald Forsythe, and Paul Gentilozzi, would still have to work hard to get the 18 racecars they promised would be on track for the scheduled Grand Prix of Long Beach on April 18.  Two CART teams founded in 2003, American Spirit Team Johansson and Fittipaldi-Dingman Racing, would not race in 2004, while U. E. "Pat" Patrick, one of the original founders of CART, sold off his CART team assets before starting a short-lived IRL effort.

Long Beach Season Premiere and its aftermath
On March 9 a "Season Premiere" promotional event was held in Long Beach, California, announcing 12 confirmed drivers and a 16 race schedule.  However, just two days later on March 11, Adrián Fernández threw the plans for the season into serious doubt by announcing the one car team he had presented at Long Beach would not compete in the Champ Car series.  He instead expanded his Indy Racing League team to two cars (even though the IRL season had already seen its first race).  Another blow came a week later on March 18 when Bobby Rahal, onetime CEO of CART and 3 time series champion and who also presented a one car team in Long Beach, announced he would not compete in CART and would also run a two car IRL team like Fernández.

Champ Car makes it to Long Beach
Momentum for Champ Car began to turn in the aftermath of Rahal's exit when his driver, Michel Jourdain Jr., announced that he and his sponsor, the Mexican supermarket Gigante would not follow Rahal to the IRL.  Jourdain ended up driving for the new RuSPORT team, partnering with rookie A. J. Allmendinger.  On March 20, Herdez Competition announced that Ryan Hunter-Reay would race a 2nd car for them.  On March 24 Gerald Forsythe expanded his team from two cars to three, providing a seat for Patrick Carpentier.  Conquest Racing announced a two car team featuring ex-Formula One driver Justin Wilson on March 25, with Alex Sperafico filling the second seat two days later. Walker Racing's one car team announced on April 8 proved to be the final piece of the puzzle to get to the 18 car field promised by the Champ Car partners in January. Although his participation with two cars was already known, Dale Coyne waited until just before practice began for the Grand Prix of Long Beach to announce that his drivers would be Champ Car veterans Oriol Servià and Tarso Marques.

Mid-season changes

 F1 veteran Gastón Mazzacane replaced Tarso Marques at Dale Coyne Racing beginning with the race in Milwaukee.
 Rocketsports Racing swapped out rookie driver Nelson Philippe for Champ Car veteran Memo Gidley after "contractual issues" at Toronto.
 Rocketsports changed drivers again for the Road America round, bringing in Indy Lights and sports car veteran Guy Smith to replace Memo Gidley.
 Mi-Jack Conquest Racing brought in Nelson Philippe to take the place of Alex Sperafico beginning with the Denver round.
 Mi-Jack Conquest's #14 team began racing a Lola chassis beginning in Montreal.
 Walker Racing brought out a second car for the final two rounds of the season.  Australian David Besnard drove the car at Surfer's Paradise.  Toyota Atlantic veteran Michael Valiante took over the drive at Mexico City.
 Dale Coyne Racing replaced Gastón Mazzacane with Jarek Janiš for the race at Surfer's Paradise.
 Tarso Marques returned to Dale Coyne Racing for the final race of the season at Mexico City.

Rule changes 
The mandatory pit window rule from the previous two seasons was eliminated. At early races, teams were given a mandatory number of green flag pit stops but this was also dropped after the first two races of the season. However, the rule was re-instituted for the Las Vegas round to eliminate a possible fuel economy race with no push to pass.
For non-oval track races, Bridgestone introduced two types of tires, both of which had to be used unless wet weather tires were used: A primary black-walled tire and a secondary red-walled option tire. The option tire was a softer, faster tire but less durable than the primary tire.
For non-oval track races, Ford-Cosworth introduced the "push to pass" button, giving each driver an additional 50 horsepower for 60 seconds per race. The driver activated the function with a green button on the steering wheel, the boost would continue until the driver took his foot off the throttle for 1 second or time ran out.

Season summary

Schedule 

 Oval/Speedway
 Dedicated road course
 Temporary street circuit

The initial schedule announced by Champ Car at the Long Beach Season Premiere event included 16 races.  One event that didn't make the final schedule was a race on a street circuit in Seoul, South Korea on October 17, a week before the Surfers Paradise race, but the race was cancelled on September 24 because of "environmental issues", two months after reports that government approval for a race near Seoul World Cup Stadium could not be arranged in time. The second was a "TBA" event that was scheduled to take place somewhere in the United States after the Gran Premio Telmex/Tecate in Mexico City and never materialized. A second TBA event on the initial schedule became the Bridgestone 400 on September 25 at the Las Vegas Motor Speedway, which was announced on July 7.

Race results

Final driver standings

Nation's Cup 

 Top result per race counts towards the Nation's Cup

Chassis Constructor's Cup

Driver breakdown

Notes

References

See also
 2004 Toyota Atlantic Championship season
 2004 Indianapolis 500
 2004 IndyCar Series
 2004 Infiniti Pro Series season

Champ Car seasons
Champ Car
Champ Car
2004 in Champ Car
Champ Car